Jiří Bartl (born 22 October 1963) is a Czech former football player and currently a football manager.

Having previously been manager of SFC Opava and assistant manager, Bartl took over as manager at Gambrinus liga side Teplice in January 2007 following an illness to manager Vlastislav Mareček. At the end of the 2006–07 season, he was dismissed from his position.

He was announced as the new manager of Hlučín in September 2010. However the club experienced a difficult season, finishing last in the 2010–11 Czech 2. Liga, and he was sacked in June 2011.

References

External links
 Profile at idnes.cz 
 OPAVSKÉ HVĚZDY: Jiří Bartl - velká postava, které učarovalo potápění at Deník.cz 

1963 births
Living people
Czech footballers
Czechoslovak footballers
Czech First League players
MFK Vítkovice players
FC Baník Ostrava players
SFC Opava players
Czech football managers
FK Teplice managers
SFC Opava managers
Association football midfielders
FK Fotbal Třinec players